The Mourning Bride is a tragedy written by British playwright William Congreve. It premiered in 1697 at Betterton's Co., Lincoln's Inn Fields. The play centers on Zara, a queen held captive by Manuel, King of Granada, and a web of love and deception which results in the mistaken murder of Manuel who is in disguise, and Zara's also mistaken suicide in response.

Quotations
There are two very widely known quotations in the play; from the opening to the play:
Music has charms to soothe a savage breast,
The word "breast" is often misquoted as "beast" and "has" sometimes appears as "hath".

Also often repeated is a quotation of Zara in Act III, Scene II:

 Heav'n has no rage, like love to hatred turn'd,
Nor hell a fury, like a woman scorn'd.
This is usually misquoted as "Hell hath no fury like a woman scorned."

A similar line is found in Colley Cibber's play Love's Last Shift in 1696:

He shall find no Fiend in Hell can match the fury of a disappointed Woman! 
- Scorned! slighted! dismissed without a parting Pang!

Notes

References
Erskine-Hill, H., Lindsay, A. (eds), William Congreve: The Critical Heritage, Routledge (1995).
Congreve, W., The Works of Mr. Congreve: Volume 2. Containing: The Mourning Bride; The Way of the World; The Judgment of Paris; Semele; and Poems on Several Occasions, Adamant Media (2001), facsimile reprint of a 1788 edition published in London.
McKenzie, D., The Works of William Congreve: Volume I, OUP Oxford (2011), v. 1, pp. 5–94.
Congreve, William (1753). The Mourning Bride: A Tragedy. Dublin: J. and R. Tonson and S. Draper in the Strand. p. 46. https://books.google.com/books?id=U3ACAAAAYAAJ Retrieved 18 Aug. 2017.

External links  

The Mourning Bride, full text on talebooks.com.accessed 9 January 2014
Quotes from The Mourning Bride

1697 plays
Plays by William Congreve
Tragedy plays